Ranella gemmifera is a species of predatory sea snail, a marine gastropod mollusk in the family Ranellidae, the triton snails, triton shells or tritons.

Distribution

Description 
The maximum recorded shell length is 126 mm.

Habitat 
Minimum recorded depth is 0 m. Maximum recorded depth is 70 m.

References

 Euthyme [Frère], 1889. Description de quelques espèces nouvelles de la faune marine exotique. Bulletin de la Société Malacologique de France 6: 259-281
 Martens, E. von. (1904). Die beschalten Gastropoden der deutschen Tiefsee-Expedition 1898–1899. A. Systematisch-geographischer Teil. Wissenschaftliche Ergebnisse der deutschen Tiefsee-Expedition auf dem Dampfer "Valdivia". 7(A): 1–146, pls i–v.
 Rosenberg, G.; Moretzsohn, F.; García, E. F. (2009). Gastropoda (Mollusca) of the Gulf of Mexico, Pp. 579–699 in: Felder, D.L. and D.K. Camp (eds.), Gulf of Mexico–Origins, Waters, and Biota. Texas A&M Press, College Station, Texas
 Beu A.G. 2010. Neogene tonnoidean gastropods of tropical and South America: contributions to the Dominican Republic and Panama Paleontology Projects and uplift of the Central American Isthmus. Bulletins of American Paleontology 377-378: 550 pp, 79 pls.

External links
 Bartsch, P. (1925). Report on the Turton Collection of South African marine mollusks, with additional notes on other South African shells contained in the United States National Museum. Bulletin. United States National Museum. 91: xii + 305 pp., 54 plates.

Ranellidae